Sandy Lane may refer to:

Sandy Lane (resort), a resort in Barbados
Sandy Lane, Wiltshire, England
Sandy Lane, West Yorkshire, England
Sandy Lane, previous home stadium of English football team Worksop Town F.C.
Sandy Lane, proposed new home stadium of English football team Cray Wanderers F.C.